Connolly v. DPP [2007]  is an English criminal law case, in which the appellant sought to invoke the right to freedom of expression in the Human Rights Act 1998, without the qualification to that right being held to outweigh the right in relation to obscene or offensive hate mail directed as part of a mainstream political campaign.

Facts
Veronica Connolly sent graphic images of aborted foetuses to pharmacies. She was a Roman Catholic who objected to the morning-after pill. She was prosecuted under the Malicious Communications Act 1988. She held that the prosecution violated her right to freedom of expression under Article 10 of the European Convention on Human Rights. She was represented by Paul Diamond.

Judgment
Her appeal against conviction was dismissed. Under the Human Rights Act 1998, the restriction on her "freedom of expression" was justified because the images were grossly indecent and offensive. The restriction was for the protection of the rights of others, in accordance with the exception of Art.9 ECHR.

See also
UK employment discrimination law
UK labour law
Human Rights Act 1998

Notes

English criminal case law
Human rights in the United Kingdom
High Court of Justice cases
2007 in case law
2007 in England
2007 in British law